BMI Federal Credit Union is a federally chartered credit union based in Dublin, Ohio. It was founded in Columbus, Ohio, in 1936 to serve the employees of the Battelle Memorial Institute. BMI FCU now serves anyone who lives, works, worships, or attends school in Franklin, Licking, Fairfield, Pickaway, Madison, Union, Delaware or Morrow counties. BMI FCU has five branch locations in Central Ohio and is currently headquartered in Dublin, Ohio. 

Like all credit unions, BMI FCU is a not-for-profit financial cooperative that provides individuals and small businesses with products and services including checking accounts, online banking, certificates  of deposits and auto, credit card, and home loans. BMI FCU offers shared branching with other credit unions in Ohio. BMI FCU has been voted the #1 Credit Union in Central Ohio by the readers of Columbus C.E.O. Magazine for five years in a row. In 2012 BMI FCU was also voted Reader's Choice for best Central Ohio Credit Union by readers and subscribers of This Week Newspaper.

References

Banks established in 1936
Credit unions based in Ohio
Companies based in Dublin, Ohio
Companies based in the Columbus, Ohio metropolitan area